A list of the films produced in Mexico in 1962 (see 1962 in film):

1962

External links

1962
Films
Mexican